The Purulia–Viluppuram Superfast Express is an Superfast Express train belonging to Southern Railway zone that runs between  and  in India. It is currently being operating with 22605/22606 train numbers on a weekly basis.

Service

The 22605/Purulia–Viluppuram Weekly Superfast Express has an average speed of 57 km/hr and covers 1992 km in 34h 15m. The 22606/Viluppuram–Purulia Weekly Superfast Express has an average speed of 56 km/hr and covers 1992 km in 35h 30m .

Route and halts 

The important halts of the train are:

 
 
 
 
 
 
 
 
 
 

 
 Tiruvannamalai

Coach composition

The train has standard ICF rakes with a max speed of 110 kmph. The train consists of 18 coaches:

 1 AC II Tier
 2 AC III Tier
 7 Sleeper coaches
 6 General Unreserved
 2 Seating cum Luggage Rake

Traction

Both trains are hauled by an Erode Loco Shed-based WAP-4 electric locomotive from Purulia to Viluppuram and vice versa.

Rake sharing

The train shares its rake with 22603/22604 Kharagpur–Villupuram Superfast Express.

Direction reversal

The train reverses its direction 1 times:

Demands 
There are demands to extend this train till Puducherry from Villupuram Junction.

See also 

 Purulia Junction railway station
 Viluppuram Junction railway station
 Kharagpur–Villupuram Superfast Express

Notes

References

External links 

 22605/Purulia–Villupuram Weekly Superfast Express India Rail Info
 22606/Villupuram–Purulia Weekly Superfast Express India Rail Info

Express trains in India
Rail transport in West Bengal
Rail transport in Odisha
Rail transport in Andhra Pradesh
Rail transport in Tamil Nadu
Railway services introduced in 2012